The term protomatter may reference:

 in programming, a Java logging framework
 in cosmology, a theoretical primordial plasma, ylem, in the Big-Bang generation of matter
 in fiction, a substance featuring in the list of Star Trek materials